Shqiprim Arifi (born 14 June 1976) is a Serbian politician serving as the head of the Alternative for Changes and the mayor of the Preševo municipality since 11 April 2022. Arifi is a representative of the country's Albanian community.

Biography 
Arifi was born on 14 June 1976 to an Albanian family in Mannheim, in what was then West Germany. His family hails from the village of Trnava, in the vicinity of Preševo. In Germany he attended elementary school and graduated from economics high school in 1998.

After graduating, he started working for HAAF as an international sector manager, and in 2002 he started a private business in the field of logistics, while soon opening branches of his company in Stuttgart, Leipzig, Hamburg, Bratislava and Kumanovo.

He moved from Germany to Preševo in 2013.

After the 2016 Serbian local elections, he was elected president of the municipality of Preševo, while he was re-elected in February 2018. In 2016, Arifi became the president of one of the local governments in Serbia, although he did not speak Serbian.

He advocates the annexation of the Preševo Valley to Kosovo.

Personal life 
Arifi is married and has three daughters.

References 

1976 births
Living people
Politicians from Mannheim
Businesspeople from Mannheim
Albanians in Serbia
Serbian businesspeople
Serbian politicians
Mayors of places in Serbia
German businesspeople
German politicians
German people of Albanian descent
German people of Serbian descent